Steffen Tigges (born 31 July 1998) is a German professional footballer who plays as a striker for Bundesliga club 1. FC Köln.

Club career

Borussia Dortmund
On 3 January 2021, Tigges came on as a substitute for Erling Haaland in the Borussia Dortmund's match against VfL Wolfsburg, making his Bundesliga debut.

Personal life
Tigges' twin brother Leon is also a professional footballer.

References

External links
 Profile on DFB.de
 
 

1998 births
Living people
German footballers
Germany youth international footballers
Association football forwards
VfL Osnabrück players
Borussia Dortmund players
Borussia Dortmund II players
1. FC Köln players
Bundesliga players
Regionalliga players
3. Liga players
Sportspeople from Osnabrück